Press coverage of the World War I was affected by restrictions on the movement of non-combatant observers and strict censorship. This raises the question of the role the media plays in selecting news about such conflicts. Events which support the position of either one of the protagonists in a conflict are understood as instrumental factors in the modern mediated conflict, and the publication of information on these events is construed as one of the major goals of the conflicting parties and one important activity of journalists.

In Britain, there were initially five official accredited war correspondents: Philip Gibbs, Percival Philips, Henry Perry Robinson, Herbert Russell, and William Beach Thomas. Their reports were vetted by C. E. Montague. Other writers and journalists who later received official accreditation from the British government were John Buchan, Robert Donald, Hamilton Fyfe, Henry Nevinson, and Valentine Williams.

Select list 

 Ellis Ashmead-Bartlett, The Times (London)
 Charles Bean, Sydney Morning Herald (New South Wales, Australia).
 Valery Bryusov, Russkiye Vedomosti, (Moscow).
 Richard Harding Davis, Wheeler Syndicate (USA), Daily Chronicle (London)
 Rheta Childe Dorr
 Granville Roland Fortescue, Daily Telegraph (London)
 Hamilton Fyfe, Daily Mail (London).
 Floyd Gibbons, Chicago Tribune
 Philip Gibbs, The War Illustrated (London); Daily Chronicle (London).
 Louis Grondijs, Nieuwe Rotterdamsche Courant (Rotterdam); L'Illustration (Paris); Daily Telegraph.
 Henry Gullett (Australia) 
 Bertie 'B J' Hodson, Central News Agency
 Peggy Hull, She was published in the Chicago Tribune(Army Edition), along with the Junction City Daily Sentinel and Home Journal. She reported on the Western Front in France. She also covered the Siberian intervention.
 Will Irvin, Collier's
 F. Tennyson Jesse, Collier's
 Robert Scotland Liddell, The Sphere
 Louise Mack, The Evening News & Daily Mail
 Gerald Morgan Collier's
 Keith Murdoch Melbourne Herald & Sydney Sun (Australia)
 E. Alexander Powell, New York World; ''Scribner's; Daily Mail.
 Mikhail Prishvin, Rech, (Saint Petersburg).
 Charles à Court Repington, The Times.
 Mary Roberts Rinehart, The Saturday Evening Post.
 Charles Patrick Smith, The Argus (Melbourne)
 William Beach Thomas, Daily Mail.
 Aleksey Tolstoy, Russkiye Vedomosti, (Moscow).
 Frederick Villiers, Illustrated London News.
 Alice Waterman.

See also
 List of participants to Paris Peace Conference, 1919
 Military attachés and observers in the Russo-Japanese War
 United Nations Military Observer

Notes

References

Further reading

 

 World War I
 
World War I-related lists
Lists of journalists